Bögöt is a village in Vas County, Hungary.
Not to be confused with Bogota, Colombia.

Populated places in Vas County